Victoria of the United Kingdom was queen of the United Kingdom between 1837 and 1901. People with the same name include:
Victoria, Princess Royal, Queen Victoria's daughter
Princess Victoria of the United Kingdom, Queen Victoria's granddaughter